Balaenoptera bertae is an extinct species of baleen whale that lived from 3.35 to 2.5 Mya during the Pliocene in the region of today's San Francisco Bay Area. Il held, also during the early to middle Neogene, a diverse assembly of cetaceans. Their fossilized remains were found in the Purisima Formation. The species Balaenoptera bertae was discovered in 2013.

Description  

Balaenoptera bertae is estimated to be . It is slightly smaller than the modern minke whale. It is known from a partial skull which is missing a maxilla, premaxillae and nasals.

References 

Baleen whales
Pliocene cetaceans
Neogene United States
Fossils of the United States
Fossil taxa described in 2013
Prehistoric mammals of North America